APF Electronics, Inc. was a publicly traded company in the United States dedicated to consumer electronics. The company's name comes from the initials of the two brothers who founded the company, Al & Phil Friedman.

History

The company was founded to import stereos from Japan to the U.S., specifically quadraphonic sets and 8-track player. They moved into calculators.

APF had locations in Queens, NY where they were headquartered, and in Hong Kong, where they owned a factory. In all, APF employed 300 people.

Products

APF marketed calculators in the early 1970s. Models such as the Mark III and Mark V had LED displays and used C batteries.

APF TV Fun was a series of classic first generation video game consoles. It is one of the first system based on the common AY-3-8500 chipset from General Instruments. There are TV Fun Model 401A and TV Fun Sportsarama. The series was first available in 1976.

APF-MP1000, also called M-1000, was a second generation video game console released in 1978 at a price of $130.  Twelve cartridges were released in addition to the built-in game Rocket Patrol.

APF PeCos One was a computer system released in 1978.   The name stood for "Personal Computing System." It came equipped with two built-in tape drives  and a monitor. Instead of using BASIC it used a proprietary language called PeCos 1.

APF Imagination Machine was a computer module released in 1979 for $599. When combined with the M-1000 console it became a computer. The module added RAM, BASIC, a 53-key typewriter keyboard, and a  dual-track cassette tape deck with 1500 baud rate for digitally recorded tape programs. The specifications were the result of reverse engineering several popular computers at the time.

APF Mathemagician is a tabletop handheld calculator game released in 1980. By itself, it's a math learning tool and standard calculator, but it has 6 different overlays that convert it into one of several games.

APF Imagination Machine II was a computer-video game console hybrid that was in the final development stages around 1983. It was more powerful and was an all-in-one unit. The project was cancelled. It is unknown if any prototypes exist.

Bankruptcy

The video game crash of 1983 caused the APF Imagination Machine II project to be cancelled and APF, by then a publicly traded company, filed for bankruptcy.

References

Defunct retail companies of the United States
Home computer hardware companies
Defunct companies based in New York City
Electronics companies established in 1970
Retail companies established in 1970
Retail companies disestablished in 1983
Companies that filed for Chapter 11 bankruptcy in 1983
Video game companies established in 1970
Video game companies disestablished in 1983
Defunct video game companies of the United States